|}

The Holloway's Hurdle is a Class 2 National Hunt hurdle race in Great Britain which is open to horses aged four years or older. It is run at Ascot over a distance of about 2 miles and 3½ furlongs (2 miles 3 furlongs and 58 yards, or 3,875 metres), and during its running there are ten hurdles to be jumped. It is a handicap race, and it is scheduled to take place each year in January. Prior to 2016 it was run as handicap with a limited weight race and carried Grade 2 status, after which it was demoted to Grade 3 status until 2022.

Winners
 Weights given in stones and pounds.

See also
 Horse racing in Great Britain
 List of British National Hunt races

References
 Racing Post:
 , 

 pedigreequery.com – Holloway's Hurdle – Ascot.

National Hunt races in Great Britain
Ascot Racecourse
National Hunt hurdle races